The Apostolic Nunciature to Savoy was an ecclesiastical office of the Catholic Church to the Duchy of Savoy, Italy. It was a diplomatic post of the Holy See, whose representative is called the Apostolic Nuncio with the rank of an ambassador. The office ceased to exist in 1795 soon after the Duchy of Savoy was occupied by French revolutionary forces in 1792 after the French Revolution .

References

Savoy
Apostolic Nuncios to Savoy